Predrag Samardžiski (born April 11, 1986) is a Macedonian professional basketball player who plays for EuroNickel 2005 of the Macedonian League.

Professional career
Samardžiski started his career at KK Partizan in the 2004–05 season. He then played with KK FMP for five years (2005–2010). In August 2010, he signed for Olin Edirne of Turkey. In May 2011 he signed with BC Lietuvos rytas in Lithuania.

In January 2013 he returned to Adriatic league by signing a contract with Crvena zvezda until the end of 2012–13 season. On Jule 1, 2013, he signed with Mersin Büyükşehir Belediyesi. In July 2014, he signed with TED Ankara Kolejliler. On 10 December 2014 he signed a release agreement with TED Ankara and became a free agent. On 18 December 2014 he signed with MZT Aerodrom.

In September, 2015, he signed a short-term contract with Mega Leks. On November 10, 2015, he left Mega and signed with the Turkish club Tüyap Büyükçekmece for the rest of the season. 

On January 19, 2017, Samardžiski returned to Mega Leks, signing a contract for the rest of the 2016–17 season. On July 10, 2017, he re-signed with Mega. He left the Mega after the season.

International career
Samardžiski plays for the Macedonian national team. He was a member of the team at the EuroBasket 2009 and he was also a key member of team that reached the semi-finals at the EuroBasket 2011, averaging 5.8 points per game throughout the tournament and ending up among the top ten shot blockers.
On the 21 July, Samardžiski was named the new captain of the Macedonian national team, after the withdrawal of Pero Antić.

Main flaws
However, in the semi-finals against Spain, where he replaced the injured Todor Gečevski as starting center, he dunked the ball twice against Spanish centers Pau and Mark Gasol. Samardžiski had a memorable game, scoring 12 points, his highest total in the tournament, and adding five rebounds.

Career statistics

Euroleague

|-
| style="text-align:left;"| 2004–05
| style="text-align:left;"| Partizan
| 11 || 4 || 13.3 || .440 || .000 || .250 || 2.9 || 0.5 ||  0.8 || 0.4 || 2.5 || 0.9
|-
| style="text-align:left;"| 2005–06
| style="text-align:left;"| Partizan
| 2 || 0 || 3.0 || .000 || .000 || .000 || 2.0 || 0.0 ||  0.0 || 0.0 || 0.0 || 0.0
|-
| style="text-align:left;"| 2012–13
| style="text-align:left;"| Lietuvos rytas
| 10 || 8 || 15.3 || .457 || .000 || .563 || 3.3 || 0.5 ||  0.2 || 0.9 || 5.1 || 3.9
|- class="sortbottom"
| style="text-align:left;"| Career
| style="text-align:left;"|
| 23 || 12 || 13.2 || .438 || .000 || .389 || 3.0 || 0.4 ||  0.5 || 0.6 || 3.4 || 2.1

Eurocup statistics

|-
| style="text-align:left;"| 2005–06
| style="text-align:left;"| FMP
| 9 || 2 || 12.7 || .600 || .000 || .550 || 2.7 || 0.8 || 0.3 || 0.8 || 3.9 || 6.1
|-
| style="text-align:left;"| 2006–07
| style="text-align:left;"| FMP
| 15 || 5 || 18.2 || .614 || .000 || .545 || 5.4 || 0.8 || 1.3 || 0.6 || 6.3 || 9.7
|-
| style="text-align:left;"| 2007–08
| style="text-align:left;"| FMP
| 8 || 7 || 24.0 || .596 || .1000 || .694 || 7.0 || 1.3 || 1.1 || 0.6 || 11.8 || 15.6
|-
| style="text-align:left;"| 2008–08
| style="text-align:left;"| FMP
| 6 || 2 || 20.0 || .585 || .000 || .525 || 6.5 || 0.3 || 0.8 || 1.3 || 11.5 || 15.2
|-
| style="text-align:left;"| 2011–12
| style="text-align:left;"| Lietuvos rytas
| 14 || 1 || 15.5 || .651 || .000 || .600 || 4.5 || 0.9 || 0.8 || 0.7 || 5.3 || 8.7
|-
| style="text-align:left;"| 2012–13
| style="text-align:left;"| Crvena zvezda
| 3 || 2 || 15.0 || .267 || .000 || .1000 || 4.3 || 0.7 || 0.3 || 0.3 || 4.0 || 3.0
|-class="sortbottom"
| style="text-align:left;"| Career
| style="text-align:left;"|
| 55 || 19 || 17.4 || .589 || .500 || .592 || 5.0 || 0.8 || 0.9 || 0.7 || 6.9 || 9.9

References

External links
 Predrag Samardžiski at aba-liga.com
 Predrag Samardžiski at euroleague.net
 Predrag Samardžiski at TBLStat.net

1986 births
Living people
ABA League players
Basketball League of Serbia players
BC Rytas players
Büyükçekmece Basketbol players
Centers (basketball)
KK Crvena zvezda players
KK FMP (1991–2011) players
KK Mega Basket players
KK MZT Skopje players
KK Partizan players
Macedonian expatriate basketball people in Serbia
Macedonian men's basketball players
Mersin Büyükşehir Belediyesi S.K. players
Sportspeople from Skopje